Philipp Hütter (born 17 August 1990) is an Austrian professional footballer who plays as a midfielder for DSV Leoben.

Club career
Hütter signed his professional contract with SK Sturm Graz in 2012.

On 20 December 2021, Hütter joined DSV Leoben in the fourth-tier Landesliga Steiermark.

References

External links
 Player profile at regionalliga.at
 

1990 births
Living people
People from Bruck an der Mur
Austrian footballers
Association football midfielders
SK Sturm Graz players
Kapfenberger SV players
SC Wiener Neustadt players
SK Austria Klagenfurt players
DSV Leoben players
Austrian Football Bundesliga players
2. Liga (Austria) players
Austrian Regionalliga players
Austrian Landesliga players
Footballers from Styria